MabelOboh Center For Save Our stars (MOCSOS) is a Non-governmental organization headquartered in Lagos, Nigeria. It was established by Mabel Oboh in 2018 to cater for the needs of Entertainers that have critical medical conditions and ailments  with no means of financial support, and for other less privileged Nigerians.

MOCSOS led the campaign that introduced an affordable and accessible Health care scheme MOCSOS Health Insurance for Nigeria entertainers to reduce the unnecessary rampant deaths of entertainers and to encourage the practice of Preventive healthcare.

History and Activities 

In 2018, the organization signed a healthcare partnership deal with Ronsberger Nigeria Limited a Health maintenance organization (HMO) Company authorized and regulated by the National Health Insurance Scheme. The healthcare scheme (Mocsos health insurance) is for entertainers who often go cap in hand to beg for financial assistance whenever they are down with critical ailments.

Baba Fryo served as an ambassador to the NGO. MOCSOS supported/ raised funds for celebrities like Lord of ajasa, yellow banton, Sadiq Daba, Danfo drivers etc through it health schemes.

Mabeloboh Center For save Our stars (MOCSOS) also initiated the advocacy against the killing of Esanland displaced farmers in Edo State, Nigeria by Marauding Killer-herdsmen.

References 

Non-profit organizations based in Nigeria
Non-profit organizations based in Lagos
Nigerian entertainers
Entertainment in Nigeria
Healthcare in Nigeria
Medical and health organizations based in Nigeria
2018 establishments in Nigeria
Nigeria